Phasianotrochus is a genus of sea snails. They are marine gastropod molluscs in the family Trochidae, the top snails.

Description
The elongated, ovate-pointed shell is thick, solid, polished. The ovate aperture is longer than broad. The columella is arcuate, bearing usually a tooth-like projection in the middle.

Distribution
These marine snails are endemic to Australia and can be found off the coast of New South Wales, South Australia, Tasmania, Victoria and Western Australia.

Species

According to the Indo-Pacific Molluscan Database, the following species with names in current use are included within the genus Phasianotrochus
 Phasianotrochus apicinus (Menke, 1843)
 Phasianotrochus bellulus (Philippi, 1845)
 Phasianotrochus eximius (Perry, 1811)
 Phasianotrochus hirasei (Pilsbry, 1901)
 Phasianotrochus irisodontes (Quoy & Gaimard, 1834)
 Phasianotrochus rutilus (Adams, 1853)
 Phasianotrochus sericinus (Thiele, 1930)

References

 Cotton, B.C., 1959. South Australian Mollusca. Archaeogastropoda (page 104), South Australian Government Printer, Adelaide.
 Iredale, T. & McMichael, D.F., 1962, A reference list of the marine Mollusca of New South Wales. Mem. Aust. Mus., 11:0-0
 Ludbrook, N.H., 1956, The molluscan fauna of the Pliocene strata underlying the Adelaide Plains. Part III � Scaphopoda, Polyplacophora, Gastropoda (Haliotidae to Tornidae), Trans. R. Soc. SA, 79:0-0

External links

 
Trochidae
Gastropods of Australia
Gastropod genera